Denton Webber Elliot (February 18, 1914 – December 25, 1998) was an American professional basketball player. He played in the National Basketball League for the Columbus Athletic Supply in nine games and averaged 2.8 points per game. He coached high school basketball after his playing days.

References

1914 births
1998 deaths
American men's basketball players
United States Navy personnel of World War II
Basketball coaches from Ohio
Basketball players from Ohio
Columbus Athletic Supply players
Guards (basketball)
High school basketball coaches in the United States
Otterbein Cardinals men's basketball players
People from Bellefontaine, Ohio